Livin' the Blues is an album by blues/jazz vocalist Jimmy Rushing released by the BluesWay label in 1968.

Reception

AllMusic reviewer Dave Nathan stated: "Despite that this was one of the last recordings Rushing made before his death, he was still in the top of his form andcould shout the blues with the best of them".

Track listing
 "Sent for You Yesterday (Here You Come Today)" (Count Basie, Eddie Durham, Jimmy Rushing) – 4:10
 "Bad Loser" (Connie Rushing, Rose Marie McCoy) – 4:18
 "Sonny Boy Blues" (George David Weiss, George Douglas) – 4:43
 "We Remember Prez" (Dickie Wells) – 4:55
 "Cryin' Blues" (Weiss, Douglas) – 4:36
 "Take Me Back Baby" (Basie, Tab Smith, Jimmy Rushing) – 6:10
 "Tell Me I'm Not Too Late" (Connie Rushing, Rose Marie McCoy) – 7:37

Personnel
Jimmy Rushing – vocals
Dickie Wells – trombone
Buddy Tate – tenor saxophone
Dave Frishberg – piano
Hugh McCracken, Wally Richardson – guitar
Bobby Bushnell – Fender bass
Joe Marshall – drums

References

Jimmy Rushing albums
1968 albums
BluesWay Records albums
Albums produced by Bob Thiele